Wolverine Canyon, UT is a canyon near the town of Boulder, Utah. It is small, only 3 miles in length until it meets with Horse Canyon and Little Death Hollow, and then leads down to the Escalante River.

Canyons and gorges of Utah
Canyons and gorges of Garfield County, Utah